Viettessa is a genus of moths of the family Crambidae.

Species
Viettessa bethalis (Viette, 1958)
Viettessa margaritalis (Hampson, 1899)
Viettessa villiersi (Marion, 1957)

References

Natural History Museum Lepidoptera genus database

Eurrhypini
Crambidae genera